Padang Panjang (sometimes written as Padangpanjang, spelled as Padang Pandjang in Dutch East Indies era,), is a city located in the cool highlands of West Sumatra, inland from the provincial capital Padang. It sits on a plateau beneath the volcanoes Mount Marapi and Mount Singgalang. It has an area of 23.0 km² and a population at the 2010 Census of 47,008 and 56,311 at the 2020 Census.

Home to a famous performing arts conservatorium, Sekolah Tinggi Seni Indonesia (STSI or "Indonesian College of the Art") Padang Panjang, the town stretches up the hill from the marketplace and central mosque, to the soccer field and bus terminal on up to STSI. The main road through Padang Panjang links coastal Padang and the highland capital, Bukittinggi.

The city is also home to the Minangkabau Cultural Documentation and Information Center (Pusat Dokumentasi dan Informasi Kebudayaan Minangkabau - PDIKM).

Administrative Districts 
Padang Panjang city consists of two districts (kecamatan), tabulated below with their areas and population totals from the 2010 Census and the 2020 Census. The table also includes the number of administrative villages (urban kelurahan) in each district, and its postal codes. 

The totals in 2018 included 26,402 males and 26,592 females.

Administrative villages (kelurahan)
West Padang Panjang District consists of the 8 villages of Silaing Bawah, Silaing Atas, Pasar Usang, Kampung Manggis, Tanah Hitam, Pasar Baru, Bukit Surungan and Balai-Balai. East Padang Panjang District comprises the 8 villages of Koto Panjang, Koto Katik, Ngalau, Ekor Lubuk, Sigando, Ganting, Guguk Malintang and Tanah Pak Lambik.

Town without cigarette advertisements
Since 2008, Padangpanjang is the only city in Indonesia without cigarette advertisements. In public areas, public transport, and youth facilities, smoking is prohibited. In other areas, smoking is restricted to smoking rooms. In 2014, some pulmonologists wished to transfer to other towns, because of the lack of patients.

Notable people
 Arifin Bey, diplomat, editor, teacher, author
 Sri Owen, food writer and cook who introduced Indonesian cuisine to the English-speaking world
 Tommy Rifka Putra, footballer
 Rahmah el Yunusiyah, women's education activist and member of the Indonesian parliament

Gallery

References

External links
 

 
Cities in West Sumatra
Populated places in West Sumatra